Dacica (or De bello dacico) is a Latin work by Roman Emperor Trajan, written in the spirit of Julius Caesar's commentaries like  De Bello Gallico, and describing Trajan's campaigns in Dacia.

It is assumed to be based on Criton of Heraclea's Getica, a work on the history of the Daco-Getae. Criton was Trajan's Greek chief physician and procurator, during the Dacian wars.

Based on the research so far, Dacica is considered lost.  However, one sentence survived in the Latin grammar work by Priscian. To describe a grammatical rule, Priscian cites Trajan: inde Berzobim, deinde Aizi processimus , meaning We then advanced to Berzobim, next to Aizi. The phrase describes the initial penetration into Dacia by the Roman army. It also mentions two Dacian towns where later Roman castra were built: Berzovia and Aizis.

See also
 Dacia
 Aizis

Notes

References 

 
 Sprache Und Literatur (Einzelne Autoren Seit Der Hadrianischen Zeit Und Allgemeines Zur Literatur Des 2. Und 3. Jahrhunderts), Volume 2; Volume 34 by Wolfgang Haase

External links 
 Traiani Augusti, Dacica at Forum Romanum

Writers of lost works
Lost books
2nd-century historians
Books about Dacia
Trajan